Barqa was a Palestinian Arab village located 37 km north of Gaza near the modern-day Israeli city of Ashdod. It was referred to as Barka by the Greeks and Bareca by the Romans during their rule over the ancient Philistine city. In 1945, the village had a population of 890 and total land area of 5,206 dunums.

It was occupied and depopulated  on May 13, 1948 during Operation Barak, a Yishuv offensive in southern Palestine just prior to the outbreak of the 1948 Arab-Israeli War.

History
It is likely that Barqa was built on the site of the Greek town of Barka, which the Romans called Baraca. The villagers were Muslim, and around the village mosque were a number of tombs that they referred to as the tombs of Shaykh Muhammad, Shaykh Zarruq, and the prophet (al-nabi) Barq.

A burial chamber with four arcosolia have been  uncovered at Barqa. It contained three pottery lamps, dated to the late Roman or Byzantine era, and two Byzantine glass vessels, dated to  fifth century CE.  The village was a major centre in the Byzantine era. In 511 CE a richly decorated  basilica church was built, with a mosaic floor. It was in use until the seventh century.

Ottoman era
It had a population of 12 households, all Muslim. They paid a fixed  tax-rate of 25% on agricultural products, including wheat, barley, summer crops, fruit trees and sesame;  the taxes totalled 2,100  akçe.

In 1838,  Robinson noted Burka as a Muslim village  located in the Gaza district.   

In 1863  Victor Guérin visited and noted, lying beside a well, several trunks of greyish marble. A   kubbeh  was here, dedicated to Neby Barak, and surrounded by tombs. An Ottoman village list from about 1870 showed that   Burka  had  a population of 202, with a total of  80  houses, though the population count included men, only. 

In 1882  the PEF's Survey of Western Palestine described Barqa as an "ordinary" village, with the tomb of Neby Burk.

British Mandate of Palestine

In the 1922 census of Palestine conducted by the British Mandate authorities, Burqa had a population of 448 inhabitants, all Muslims, which had increased in  the 1931 census  to 600, 593 Muslim, 6 Jews and 1 Christian, in a total of in 123 houses.

In  the 1945 statistics the population of Barqa consisted of  890, all Muslims,  and the  land area was 5,206  dunams, according to an official land and population survey. Of this, 667 dunams were designated for  citrus and bananas, 
47 for plantations and irrigable land, 4,031 for cereals, while 26 dunams were built-up areas.

1948 and aftermath
Barqa became depopulated on May 13, 1948, after a military assault by the Yishuv's  Giv'ati forces. The area was subsequently incorporated into the State of Israel. In 1992, the village remaining structures on the village land were described: 
"Two houses remain standing on the site. One serves as a warehouse; it is made of concrete and has a covered portico on two sides. The other, a stone house with rectangular doors and windows and a flat roof, stands deserted in the midst of wild vegetation. The site is overgrown with weeds interspersed with cactuses and eucalyptus and palm trees. Israelis cultivate the land around the site"

References

Bibliography

  p. 862

External links
 Barqa, at Palestine Remembered
  Barqa, Zochrot
Survey of Western Palestine, Map 16:   IAA, Wikimedia commons
 Tomb of the Neby Burk (Barq)
 Barqa from the Khalil Sakakini Cultural Center

District of Gaza
Arab villages depopulated prior to the 1948 Arab–Israeli War